Poppy Gabriella Drayton (born 7 June 1991) is a British actress. She is known for playing Elizabeth Thatcher in the feature-length Hallmark Channel television pilot of When Calls the Heart, for playing Amberle Elessedil in the MTV fantasy drama series The Shannara Chronicles, and for playing Abigael in the second and third seasons of The CW fantasy drama television series Charmed.

Life and career
Drayton graduated from the Arts Educational School in Chiswick.

In 2013 Drayton was cast in her first major role in the Hallmark Channel television movie pilot for When Calls the Heart, in which she played Elizabeth Thatcher (a role that was taken over by Erin Krakow in the subsequent television series). This was followed by a role in the 2013 Downton Abbey Christmas special. Drayton has also done stage work, appearing in The Green Bay Tree at the Jermyn Street Theatre in London in 2014.

In 2014 Drayton was cast as Amberle Elessedil, one of the lead roles in the MTV fantasy drama series The Shannara Chronicles; the series premiered on 5 January 2016. In February 2016 Drayton was cast in the titular role in newly launched MVP Studios' film The Little Mermaid (originally titled A Little Mermaid), an adaptation of the Hans Christian Andersen story.

In 2019, she joined the cast of Charmed as a series regular in the role of Abigael, a mysterious witch, starting with the second season’s third episode.

Filmography

References

External links
 
 

Living people
1991 births
21st-century English actresses
Actresses from Surrey
English television actresses
People educated at the Arts Educational Schools